Çevrimtaş is a village in the Sivrice District of Elazığ Province in Turkey. The village had a population of 90 in 2021. The village is on the river Euphrates. The hamlet of Dirice is attached to the village.

On 24 Jan 2020 the village was impacted by a magnitude 6.7 earthquake.

References 

Euphrates
Villages in Sivrice District